The Chila mountain range lies in the Arequipa Region in the Andes of Peru. It extends between 15°02' and 15°26'S and 71°43' and 72°37'W for about 80 km. The range is located in the provinces of Castilla and Caylloma.

Mountains 
Other mountains are listed below:

 Casiri,  
 Mismi, 
 Minaspata, 
 Quehuisha 
 Surihuiri, 
 Yuraccacsa, 
 Jatunpila, 
 Airicoto, 
 Aceruta, 
 Chinchón, 
 Choquepirhua, 
 Chila Pillune, 
 Chuañuma, 
 Quiscapampa, 
 Huayta, 
 Teclla, 
 Yuaytacondorsenja, 
 Apacheta, 
 Ticlla (Castilla), 
 Huayllatarpuna, 
 Huayllayoc, 
 Jatunchungara, 
 Ajo Colluna, 
 Asnohuañusja,  
 Solimana,  
 Cerani, 
 Japutani, 
 Condor, 
 Condorcacha, 
 Colquere,   
 Samacasa, 
 Sillane, 
 Sullucullahua, 
 Huanca,   
 Huañacagua, 
 Huayllayoc, 
 Yanajaja, 
 Chila, 
 Chuaña, 
 Parhuayane, 
 Huaillaccocha, 
 Ojeccasa, 
 Ticlla, 
 Ccella Ccella, 
 Chungara, 
 Cairahuiri, 
 Minasnioc, 
 Pillune, 
 Pucara,  	
 Posoco,    	
 Huallatane, 
 Huamanripayoc, 
 Puca Mauras, 
 Huamangore, 
 Icma, 
 Hichocollo, 
 Ticlla, 
 Huancaitira, 
 Ancocala, 
 Puca Mauras,

References

Mountain ranges of Peru
 
Mountain ranges of Arequipa Region